The Chicago Wolves are a professional ice hockey team playing in the American Hockey League and are the top minor-league affiliate of the Carolina Hurricanes of the National Hockey League.  The Wolves play home games at the Allstate Arena in the Chicago suburb of Rosemont, Illinois, and are owned by Chicago business owners Don Levin and Buddy Meyers.

Originally a member of the International Hockey League, the Wolves joined the AHL after the IHL folded in 2001.

History
The Wolves won the Turner Cup twice (1998, 2000) in the IHL and the Calder Cup thrice (2002, 2008, and 2022).  The Wolves qualified for all but five postseasons (2005–06, 2008–09, 2010–11, 2012–13, and 2015–16 seasons), appearing in eight league championship finals (1998, 2000, 2001, 2002, 2005, 2008, 2019 and 2022) in their 22-year history.

The team's most notable player was forward Steve Maltais, who until his retirement after the 2004–05 season had played every season of the franchise and holds most of its scoring records.  Other notable players include goaltender Wendell Young, ex-Pittsburgh star Rob Brown and long time Chicago Blackhawks stars Troy Murray, Chris Chelios and Al Secord. The Wolves had their best season start in their 14-year history, during the 2007–08 season, winning 13 of the first 14 games, with an overtime loss. The Wolves finished the season with 111 points, and first in the Western Conference.

The Wolves were the AHL affiliate of the Atlanta Thrashers from 2001 to 2011.  The Thrashers relocated to Winnipeg in June 2011 and added the St. John's IceCaps (formerly the Manitoba Moose) as their new AHL affiliate, leaving the Wolves and the NHL's Vancouver Canucks to find new affiliates.  On June 27, 2011, the Wolves and Canucks agreed to a two–year affiliation agreement.

On April 23, 2013, the Wolves and St. Louis Blues reached a three-year affiliation agreement.  The deal was struck after the Canucks and Wolves decided not to renew their existing affiliation agreement and purchased the Peoria Rivermen franchise from the Blues creating the Utica Comets. In November 2016, it was first reported the Blues would not renew their affiliation with the Wolves and were planning to move their affiliation to Kansas City for 2017. However, this was unconfirmed and then denied by the announced potential owner in Kansas City, Lamar Hunt Jr., in a press release from his ECHL team in the area, the Missouri Mavericks, and further denied by AHL commissioner, David Andrews, after the January 2017 Board of Governors meeting.

After the 2016–17 season, the Wolves became the first affiliate of the NHL's expansion team, the Vegas Golden Knights. The Blues did not re-sign with the Wolves to be their primary NHL affiliate for the 2017–18 season. However, Blues' general manager Doug Armstrong confirmed they would still send prospects to the Wolves for that season.

During the first season of their affiliation with Vegas, the Wolves set a pair of franchise records in earning points in 14 straight games from December 9 to January 6 and 13 consecutive home wins from December 6 to February 15. In the 2018–19 season, the Wolves made the Calder Cup Finals, in which they lost to the Charlotte Checkers in five games. During the 2019–20 season, the Golden Knights stated it was looking to own and operate its own AHL team in the Las Vegas region in 2020–21, but it would not be the Wolves. The Golden Knights agreed to purchase the San Antonio Rampage franchise and move it to the Las Vegas area as the Henderson Silver Knights. On September 10, 2020, the Wolves announced an affiliation agreement with the Carolina Hurricanes. In addition, the Wolves added a temporary secondary NHL affiliate in the Nashville Predators for the 2020–21 season as the Predators' affiliate, the Milwaukee Admirals, opted out of the COVID-19 pandemic-shortened season. For the 2020–21 season, the teams' home games were at their training facility at the Triphahn Center in Hoffman Estates due to arena restrictions for fans during the pandemic.

Television
The Wolves once were the only AHL team with a full television package. As the Chicago Blackhawks' late owner Bill Wirtz had refused to allow Blackhawks home games to be televised locally, the Wolves were viewed and embraced as an alternative; the Wolves took advantage of this, going so far as to promote themselves with the slogan "We Play Hockey The Old-Fashioned Way: We Actually Win".  After Judd Sirott served as the team's play-by-play announcer for its first 12 seasons, starting in the 2006–07 season broadcast announcers were long-time Blackhawks commentators Pat Foley and Bill Gardner; Foley ultimately returned to the Blackhawks for the 2008–09 season after Bill Wirtz died and his son Rocky took over the team, reversing many of his father's policies, one of which allowed the Blackhawks' games to be aired locally on TV.  Since 2008, Jason Shaver has handled the play-by-play duties for the Wolves, along with Gardner.

Today, select regular-season home games are broadcast on WPWR-TV (My50), and WMEU-CD (The U), and all games are streamed on AHLTV.

Season-by-season results
This is a partial list of the last five seasons completed by the Wolves. For the full season-by-season history, see List of Chicago Wolves seasons

Players

Current roster
Updated March 17, 2023.

Team captains

Retired numbers

Team records

Single season

Career

See also
 List of Chicago Wolves award winners

References

Bibliography

External links

The Internet Hockey Database - Chicago Wolves (AHL)
The Internet Hockey Database - Chicago Wolves (IHL)

 
Ice hockey clubs established in 1994
Atlanta Thrashers minor league affiliates
Ice hockey teams in Illinois
1994 establishments in Illinois
Carolina Hurricanes minor league affiliates
New York Islanders minor league affiliates
St. Louis Blues minor league affiliates
Vancouver Canucks minor league affiliates
Vegas Golden Knights minor league affiliates